Wanshou Road Subdistrict is a subdistrict which lies on the southwestern of Haidian District, Beijing, China. It borders Yongding Road, Tiancun Road and Balizhuang Subdistrict to the north, Yangfangdian Subdistrict to the east, Liuliqiao Subdistrict to the south, Babaoshan and Laoshan Subdistricts to the west. Its population was 121,453 as of 2020. The subdistrict was named after Wanshou Road within it.

History

Administrative Divisions 
In 2021, Wanshou Road Subdistrict was composed of 27 communities:

See also 

 List of township-level divisions of Beijing

References 

Haidian District
Subdistricts of Beijing